The red heifer (para adumma), a female bovine which has never been pregnant or milked or yoked, also known as the red cow, was a cow brought to the priests as a sacrifice according to the Torah, and its ashes were used for the ritual purification of Tum'at HaMet ("the impurity of the dead"), that is, an Israelite who had come into contact with a human corpse, human bone or grave.

Hebrew Bible (Torah)

Book of Numbers
The red heifer offering instructions are described in the Book of Numbers. The children of Israel were commanded to obtain "a red heifer without spot, wherein is no blemish, and upon which never came yoke". The heifer is then to be slaughtered and burned outside of the camp. Cedar wood, hyssop, and wool or yarn dyed scarlet are added to the fire, and the remaining ashes are placed in a vessel containing pure water.

In order to purify a person who has become ritually contaminated by contact with a corpse, water from the vessel is sprinkled on him, using a bunch of hyssops, on the third and seventh day of the purification process.  The priest who performs the ritual then becomes ritually unclean, and must then wash himself and his clothes in living waters. He is deemed impure until evening.

Mishnah 
The Mishnah, the central compilation of Rabbinic Oral Law, the oral component of the written Torah, contains a tractate on the red heifer, Tractate Parah ("cow") in Seder Tohorot, which explains the procedures involved. The tractate has no existing Gemara, although commentary on the procedure appears in the Gemarah for other tractates of the Talmud.

Details of the commandment 
According to Mishnah Parah, the presence of two black hairs invalidates a red heifer, in addition to the usual requirements of an unblemished animal for sacrifice. There are various other requirements, such as natural birth (The caesarian section renders a heifer candidate invalid). The water must be "living" (i.e., spring water). This is a stronger requirement than for a ritual bath (mikveh); rainwater accumulated in a cistern is permitted for a mikveh but cannot be used in the red heifer ceremony.

The Mishnah reports that in the days of the Temple in Jerusalem, water for the ritual came from the Pool of Siloam. The ceremony involved was complex and detailed. To ensure the complete ritual purity of those involved, care was taken to ensure that no one involved in the red heifer ceremony could have had any contact with the dead or any form of tumah, and implements were made of materials such as stone, which in Jewish law do not act as carriers for ritual impurities. The Mishnah recounts that children were used to draw and carry the water for the ceremony, children born and reared in isolation for the specific purpose of ensuring that they never came into contact with a corpse:

Various other devices were used, including a causeway from the Temple Mount to the Mount of Olives so that the heifer and accompanying priests would not come into contact with a grave.

According to the Mishnah, the ceremony of the burning of the red heifer took place on the Mount of Olives. A ritually pure kohen slaughtered the heifer and sprinkled its blood in the direction of the Temple seven times. The red heifer was then burned on a pyre, together with crimson dyed wool, hyssop, and cedarwood. In recent years, the site of the burning of the red heifer on the Mount of Olives has been tentatively located by archaeologist Yonatan Adler.

The color
The heifer's color is described in the Torah as adumah, normally translated as "red". In addition, the Quran describes Moses being commanded about a "yellow" cow (Surat al-Baqara 9.69).

To explain this discrepancy, Yosef Qafih (in his Hebrew translation and commentary on Saadiah's work) argues that the Bible requires the cow to have a ruddy light-brown color, which he says is the normal color of a cow. He explains the Biblical requirement to mean that the cow be entirely of this color, and not have blotches or blemishes of a different color.

Jewish tradition 
A red heifer that conforms with all of the requirements imposed by halakha is practically a biological anomaly. For example, the animal must be entirely of one color (a series of tests listed by the sages must be performed to ensure this) and the hair of the cow must be absolutely straight (to ensure that the cow had not previously been yoked, as this would be a disqualifier). According to Jewish tradition, only nine red heifers were actually slaughtered in the period extending from Moses to the destruction of the Second Temple. Mishnah Parah recounts them, stating that Moses prepared the first, Ezra the second, Simon the Just and Yochanan the High Priest prepared two each, and Elioenai ben HaQayaph, Hanameel the Egyptian, and Yishmael ben Pi'avi prepared one each.

The extreme rarity of the animal, combined with the detailed ritual in which it is used, have given the red heifer special status in Jewish tradition. It is cited as the paradigm of a ḥok, a biblical law for which there is no apparent logic. Because the state of ritual purity obtained through the ashes of a red heifer is a necessary prerequisite for participating in Temple service, efforts have been made in modern times by Jews wishing for biblical ritual purity (see tumah and taharah) and in anticipation of the building of the Third Temple to locate a red heifer and recreate the ritual. However, multiple candidates have been disqualified.

The Temple Institute states, "Some opinions maintain that the newer ashes were always mixed together with a combination of the previous ashes. One way of understanding this, is to the view this mixture of old and new ashes as being yet another precautionary measure... Additionally, mixing in the newer ashes we have produced now with those from olden times is a way of connecting through time with the original heifer that was slaughtered and prepared by Moses. As such, in a sense, it is a way of connecting with the level of Moses himself." Since the last succession of ashes of the red heifer were either hidden or lost after 70 AD Vendyl Jones searched for the original ashes by following the map on the Copper Scroll that purports to tell the location, so that the old ashes can be added to the new, which serves to continue the "continuity factor."

Temple Institute

The Temple Institute, an organization dedicated to preparing the reconstruction of a Third Temple in Jerusalem, has been attempting to identify red heifer candidates consistent with the requirements of Numbers 19:1–22 and Mishnah Tractate Parah. In recent years, the institute thought to have identified two candidates, one in 1997 and another in 2002. The Temple Institute had initially declared both kosher but later found each to be unsuitable. The institute has been raising funds in order to use modern technology to produce a red heifer that is genetically based on the Red Angus. In September 2018, the institute announced a red heifer candidate was born saying "the heifer is currently a viable candidate and will be examined [to see] whether it possess[es] the necessary qualifications for the red heifer."
In September 2022, five red cows were imported from the United States, and transferred to a breeding farm in Israel. According to the rabbis who accompanied the process, the cows are kosher for sacrifice.

Quran
The second and the longest sura (chapter) in the Quran is named "al-Baqara" ( "the cow" or "the heifer") after the heifer as the commandment is related in the sura.

Ibn Kathir explains that according to Ibn Abbas and Ubaydah, it displayed the stubbornness of the Children of Israel, who asked unnecessary questions to the prophets without readily following any commandment from God; had they slaughtered a cow, any cow, it would have been sufficient for them but instead as they made the matter more difficult, God made it even more difficult for them.

Christian tradition 
The non-canonical Epistle of Barnabas (8:1) explicitly equates the red heifer with Jesus. In the New Testament, the phrases "without the gate" and "without the camp" have been taken to be not only an identification of Jesus with the red heifer, but an indication as to the location of the crucifixion.

Ancient Greek mythology 
The red heifer was also considered sacred to the Greek god Apollo. They are featured in many myths, including that of the creation of the lyre. In it Hermes steals Apollo's red heifers and then hides them. To divert Apollo's rage, Hermes gives him the lyre he had recently invented.

Geryon, the mythical three-bodied creature slain by Heracles, had red cattle, according to Pseudo-Apollodorus, which Heracles stole as his tenth labor.

Vedic rituals 
The Atharvaveda, a late addition to the Vedic scriptures of Hinduism, invokes sacred red bulls and red cows in several hymns, including Hymn I, 22, an incantation to cure jaundice:

Modern-day usage
The red heifer is the official mascot of Gann Academy, a Jewish high school located in Waltham, Massachusetts.

References

External links
"Ashes and Water – From the Chassidic Masters"
The Statute of the Torah

Jewish ritual purity law
Jewish animal sacrifice
Positive Mitzvoth
Judaism and death
Animals in the Bible
Cattle in religion